Salisediminibacterium locisalis is a Gram-positive moderately halophilic, alkaliphilic, and motile bacterium from the genus of Salisediminibacterium.

References

 

Bacillaceae
Bacteria described in 2011